Elanapis is a genus of South American araneomorph spiders in the family Anapidae, containing the single species Elanapis aisen. It was first described by Norman I. Platnick & Raymond Robert Forster in 1989, and has only been found in Chile.

References

Anapidae
Monotypic Araneomorphae genera
Spiders of South America
Taxa named by Raymond Robert Forster
Endemic fauna of Chile